Jon or Jonathan Hess may refer to:

Jon Hess (fighter) (born 1969), American martial artist
Jon Hess (lacrosse), retired lacrosse player
Jonathan Hess (figure skater) (born 2000), German figure skater
Jonathan M. Hess (1965–2018), American philologist

See also
John Hess (disambiguation)